Air Columbus was a charter airline based in Portugal, which was operational between 1989 and 1994.

History
The airline was in the air by October 1989. The Danish charter airline, Sterling Airways (1962–1993) was one of the owners behind Air Columbus. Two Boeing 727 (OY-SAS, OY-SAU), was placed in traffic with the airline in Portugal. One of the main airports was Funchal, Madeira.

The airline was flying to the Nordic countries of Norway, Sweden, Denmark and Finland. It also did flights to London Heathrow, Düsseldorf, Stuttgart and Jersey.

In 1992 the fleet was supplied with two Boeing 737-300, adopted from Norway Airlines Charter. In 1994 three more Boeing 737-300 was added to the fleet.

Fleet
The Air Columbus fleet grew to consist of 2 Boeing 727 and 5 Boeing 737-300 aircraft.

References

 Sterling och jag, Gösta Frödeberg/Lars-Åke Holst, Book,

External links
 

Defunct airlines of Portugal
Defunct charter airlines
Airlines established in 1988
Airlines disestablished in 1994
1994 disestablishments in Portugal
Portuguese companies established in 1988